Anolis garmani, the Jamaican giant anole, also known as the Jamaican anole or Jamaica giant anole, is a species of anole, a lizard in the family Dactyloidae. The species is endemic to Jamaica, but has been introduced to Florida.

Etymology
The specific name, garmani, is in honor of American herpetologist Samuel Garman.

Geographic range
The Jamaican giant anole is native to Jamaica. It has been introduced into Florida. There are recent records from Grand Cayman, but it is unclear if it has become established there.

Description
Although generally green, it turns dark brown during the night. The male has an orange-centered yellow dewlap, which is small and dusky in the female.

See also
List of Anolis lizards

References

Further reading
Schwartz A, Thomas R (1975). A Check-list of West Indian Amphibians and Reptiles. Carnegie Museum of Natural History Special Publication No. 1. Pittsburgh, Pennsylvania: Carnegie Museum of Natural History. 216 pp. (Anolis garmani, p. 83).
Stejneger L (1899). "A New Name for the Great Crested Anolis of Jamaica". American Naturalist 33: 601-602. (Anolis garmani, new name, p. 602).

Anoles
Lizards of the Caribbean
Endemic fauna of Jamaica
Reptiles of Jamaica
Reptiles described in 1899
Taxa named by Leonhard Stejneger